Encrinites are a type of grain-supported bioclastic sedimentary rock in which all or most of the grains are crinoid ossicles. In older literature, the word is sometimes used to refer to individual fossil crinoids, but this usage is obsolete.

Distribution
Encrinites form in areas where disaggregated crinoid skeletal debris becomes concentrated, typically shallow warm euhaline seas. They are therefore very common in the Paleozoic rock record of North America and Eurasia, particularly during the Silurian through Early Devonian and the Early Mississippian age, when high sea levels created widespread epeiric seas. Some encrinites are also known from the Jurassic of North America and Western Europe.

References
Ausich, W.I. 1997. Regional encrinites: a vanished lithofacies. In: Paleontological events: stratigraphic, ecologic and evolutionary implications, p. 509–519. Columbia University Press, New York.
Hunter, A.W. and Zonneveld, J.P. 2008. Palaeoecology of Jurassic encrinites: reconstructing crinoid communities from the Western Interior Seaway of North America. Palaeogeography, Palaeoclimatology, Palaeoecology 263: 58–70.

Sedimentary rocks
Prehistoric Crinozoa
Extinct animals of North America
Jurassic echinoderms